Lepreo (before 1916: Στροβίτζι - Strovitzi) is a village in the municipality of Zacharo, Elis, Greece. Its population in 2011 was 219 for the village and 366 for the community, which includes the small villages Agrapidia, Drakos, Panagies, Revelaiika and Skoupas. It is situated on a hillside, 2 km southwest of Taxiarches, 5 km west of Nea Figaleia and 8 km southeast of Zacharo. Lepreo was named after the ancient city Lepreum. The ruins of Lepreum, 500 m north of the present village, have been excavated in 1982.

Population

People

Simon Karas (1903–1999), a Greek musicologist

See also

List of settlements in Elis

References

External links
Lepreo at the GTP Travel Pages

Populated places in Elis
Zacharo